The spectacled whitestart or spectacled redstart (Myioborus melanocephalus) is a species of bird in the family Parulidae. It is found in humid Andean forests, woodland and scrub from southern Colombia to Bolivia

Taxonomy
The spectacled whitestart was described in 1844 as Setophaga melanocephala, from a type specimen collected in Maraynioc, Peru. It is sometimes known as the spectacled redstart. It forms a monophyletic group along with the yellow-fronted whitestart (M. ornatus), the white-fronted whitestart (M. albifrons), and the golden-fronted whitestart (M. chrysops). Whether all four form distinct species has been a matter of debate. M. melanocephalus and M. ornatus were previously considered the same species, and in the areas where the two come into contact in the southern Colombian Andes, intermediate phenotypes have been observed. The placement of M. m. ruficoronatus within the spectacled whitestart has also been questioned by molecular studies; M. m. ruficoronatus has been previously classified as a separate species, as has M. m. griseonuchus. The 
Handbook of the Birds of the World recognizes five subspecies within the spectacled whitestart; M. m. ruficoronatus, found in the Andes from Southwestern Colombia to Southern Ecuador; M. m. griseonuchus, found in the Western cordillera of the Andes in Northwestern Peru; M. m. malaris, found in the Central cordillera of the Andes in Northern Peru; M. m. melanocephalus, found in the Eastern cordillera of the Andes in central Peru; and M. m. bolivianus found in the Andes of Southern Peru and Western Bolivia.

Description
The species has a black face and crown, while the nape of the neck and the back are grey. The tail is largely black, but the outermost feathers have some white on them. The underside of the throat, from the throat to the tail, is yellow. The undertail coverts are white. The beak and the legs are black, while the iris is dark. Males and females are indistinguishable. Juveniles have grey on the head and back, and have an underside that is paler yellow. The species has prominent yellow "spectacles" on the face formed by a ring around the eye and a stripe running under the lores, which give the bird its name. Relative to the nominate subspecies, M. melanocephalus melanocephalus, the subspecies M. m. bolivanus is slightly smaller, and is paler in the coloration of its underside. The black region on the face is more extensive in M. m. malaris. M. m. griseonuchus also has more extensive black on its face, to a similar extent as M. m. malaris, but also has a tiny patch of rufous brown on its crown. M. m. ruficoronatus has a larger rufous patch, but is otherwise similar to M. m. melanocephalus in the rest of its coloration.

References

spectacled whitestart
Birds of the Northern Andes
spectacled whitestart
Taxonomy articles created by Polbot